Rubus ulmifolius subsp. sanctus, commonly called holy bramble, is a bramble native to parts of Asia and Europe.

This plant is very long-lived. An instance of it can be found at the Chapel of the Burning Bush on Mount Sinai, where it is revered as the original burning bush of the Bible. This longevity and location lead to its Latin name.

Chemistry
3,6-Di-O-caffeoylglucose, 1-O-caffeoylxylose and  2,3-O-hexahydroxydiphenoyl-4,6-O-sanguisorboyl-(α/β)-glucose (an ellagitannin constituted with sanguisorbic acid), are found in R. ulmifolius subsp. sanctus.

References

External links
 

ulmifolius subsp. sanctus
Berries
Flora of Lebanon
Plant subspecies